Female fertility is affected by age and is a major fertility factor for women. A woman's fertility peaks between the late teens and late-20s, after which it starts to decline slowly. While many sources suggest a more dramatic drop at around 35, this is unclear, since few studies have been conducted since the 19th century. One 2004 study of European women found fertility of the 27–34 and the 35–39 groups had only a four-percent difference. At age 45, a woman starting to try to conceive will have no live birth in 50–80 percent of cases. Menopause, or the cessation of menstrual periods, generally occurs in the 40s and 50s and marks the cessation of fertility, although age-related infertility can occur before then. The relationship between age and female fertility is sometimes referred to as a woman's "biological clock."

Quantification of effect 

The average age of a young woman's first period (menarche) is 12 to 13 (12.5 years in the United States, 12.72 in Canada, 12.9 in the UK) but, in postmenarchal girls, about 80% of the cycles are anovulatory in the first year after menarche, 50% in the third and 10% in the sixth year. A woman's fertility peaks in her early and mid-20s after which it starts to decline. However, the exact estimates of the chances of a woman to conceive after a certain age are not clear, and are subject to debate.

According to the National Institute for Health and Clinical Excellence (NICE) over 80 out of every 100 women aged under 40 who have regular unprotected sexual intercourse will get pregnant within 1 year of trying. In the second year the percentage rises to over 90%.

A 2004 study by Henri Leridon, PhD, an epidemiologist with the French Institute of Health and Medical Research, of women trying to get pregnant, without using fertility drugs or in vitro fertilization, had the following results on rates of conception by age:
At age 30
75% will have a conception ending in a live birth within one year
91% will have a conception ending in a live birth within four years
At age 35
 66% will have a conception ending in a live birth within one year
 84% will have a conception ending in a live birth within four years
At age 40
44% will have a conception ending in a live birth within one year
64% will have a conception ending in a live birth within four years

According to a study done on a sample of 782 healthy European couples ages 19–39, fertility starts declining after age 27 and drops at a somewhat greater rate after age 35. Statistical analysis showed that the women in the 27–29 age group had significantly less chance on average of becoming pregnant than did the 19- to 26-year-olds. Pregnancy rates did not change notably between the 27–29 age group and the 30–34 age group, but dropped significantly for the 35–39 age group.

The age of the male partner had a significant impact on female fertility among the women who had reached their mid-30s, but not among the younger women. However, experts said the new study was too small and there were too many variables which were too difficult to sort out, for a clear conclusion to be drawn. Some experts suggested that the main change in fertility in the older women was the fact that it took them longer to conceive, not necessarily that they were significantly more unlikely to eventually succeed. David Dunson, a biostatistician at the U.S. National Institute of Environmental Health Sciences, said that: "Although we noted a decline in female fertility in the late 20s, what we found was a decrease in the probability of becoming pregnant per menstrual cycle, not in the probability of eventually achieving a pregnancy."

A French study found no difference between the fertility rate of women under 25 and those ages 26–30, after which fertility started to decrease. Estimating the "fertility of a woman" is quite difficult because of the male factor (quality of sperm). This French study looked at 2,193 women who were using artificial insemination because their husbands were azoospermic. The cumulative success rates after 12 cycles of insemination were 73% for women under age 25, 74% in women ages 26–30, 61% for ages 31–35, and 54% in the over 35 age group.

In Hungary, a study by the Központi Statisztikai Hivatal (Central Statistics Office) estimated that 7–12% of Hungarian women younger than 30 were infertile; 13–22% of women age 35 were infertile; and 24–46% of women age 40 were infertile.

The below is a table containing estimates of the percentage of women who, if starting to conceive at a certain age, will fail to obtain a live birth. Note that while for the young ages researchers tend to agree, for older ages there is discrepancy.

Ovarian reserve 

In terms of ovarian reserve, a typical woman has 12% of her reserve at age 30 and has only 3% at age 40. 81% of variation in ovarian reserve is due to age alone, making age the most important factor in female infertility.

The most common methods of checking the status of the ovarian reserve is to perform a blood test on day 3 of the menstrual cycle to measure serum Follicle-Stimulating Hormone (FSH) level, alternatively a blood test to measure the serum Anti-Müllerian Hormone (AMH) level can give similar information. Transvaginal ultrasound can also be used to "count the number of follicles" and this procedure is called Antral Follicle Count.

The American College of Obstetricians and Gynecologists recommends ovarian reserve testing should be performed for women older than 35 years who have not conceived after 6 months of attempting pregnancy and women at higher risk of diminished ovarian reserve, such as those with a history of cancer treated with gonadotoxic therapy, pelvic irradiation, or both; those with medical conditions who were treated with gonadotoxic therapies; or those who had ovarian surgery for endometriomas.

It is important to recognize that a poor result from ovarian reserve testing does not signify an absolute inability to conceive and should not be the sole criterion considered to limit or deny access to infertility treatment.

Historical data 
A study of a population of French women from 1670 and 1789 shows that those who married at age 20–24 had 7.0 children on average and 3.7% remained childless. Women who married at age 25–29 years had a mean of 5.7 children and 5.0% remained childless. Women who married at 30–34 years had a mean of 4.0 children and 8.2% remained childless. The average age at last birth in natural fertility populations that have been studied is around 40.

In 1957, a study was done on a large population (American Hutterites) that never used birth control. The investigators measured the relationship between the age of the female partner and fertility. (Infertility rates today are believed to be higher in the general population than for the population in this study from the 1950s.)

This 1957 study found that:

 By age 30, 7% of couples were infertile
 By age 35, 11% of couples were infertile
 By age 40, 33% of couples were infertile
 At age 45, 87% of couples were infertile

Impact

Family planning 
The inverse correlation between age and female fertility in later reproductive life is argued to motivate family planning well before having reached 35 years of age. Mapping of a woman's ovarian reserve, follicular dynamics and associated biomarkers can give an individual prognosis about future chances of pregnancy, facilitating an informed choice of when to have children. Notably, a higher level of anti-Müllerian hormone when tested in women in the general population has been found to have a positive correlation with natural fertility in women aged 30–44 aiming to conceive spontaneously, even after adjusting for age. Thus, AMH measurement is helpful to determine which women may need to conceive at an earlier age, and which women can potentially wait.

Reproductive medicine 
It is recommended that women have an infertility evaluation if they are over the age of 40, or if they are over the age of 35 and have not achieved pregnancy after trying for 6 months. In many cases, infertility can be treated with many reproductive technologies, but their success declines with age. The issues of age can be discussed with a qualified fertility specialist such as a reproductive endocrinologist.

In Vitro Fertilization (IVF) is an assisted reproductive technology used to treat infertility and to help families have offspring. While many women in advanced age may opt for IVF treatment in order to have children, patients with higher maternal age (>40 years old) were found to have worse IVF outcomes and a higher miscarriage rate compared to 20–30 year olds. Most IVF centers will attempt IVF using the patient's own eggs until about age 43–45, and clinically reproductive endocrinologists tend to pursue IVF more aggressively in women over 35.

Oocyte cryopreservation (egg freezing) is a procedure done to preserve eggs (oocytes) to have the eggs thawed, fertilized, and transferred to the uterus via an IVF procedure. This gives women the ability to delay pregnancy and avoid many of the infertility problems that arise from germ cell deterioration. Studies have shown that the risk of acquiring congenital abnormalities is not increased in the infants born from frozen and thawed eggs, and IVF from thawed eggs have the same successful implantation rate compared to IVF performed with fresh eggs. While chromosomal abnormalities are avoided with egg freezing, pregnancy at older age increases the risk of gestational diabetes, preeclampsia, preterm labor, and cesarean section regardless of conception method.

Elite egg donor agencies that advertise in places such as Ivy League student newspapers offering $20,000–50,000 for donor eggs seek donors under the age of 29.

A review in 2012 came to the result that therapeutic interventions to halt or reverse the process of reproductive ageing in women is limited, despite recent reports of the potential existence of stem cells which may be used to restore the ovarian reserve.

Complications 
Women who become pregnant after age 35 are at increased risk for complications that affect the parent and fetus.

When it comes to the mother, several research studies have shown that pregnant women over 35 years of age are at increased risk for hypertension during pregnancy, eclampsia (hypertension during pregnancy with seizures), and gestational diabetes. Further, women who become pregnant after age 35 are also at risk for delivery complications. These include stillbirth, miscarriage, and complications leading to delivery via caesarean section.

Fetal complications for pregnant women after age 35 are also high. One well-known risk is the increased risk of having a baby with Down syndrome. According to the Academy of Obstetrics and Gynecology, research has shown that risk for Down syndrome increases proportionally to increasing maternal age.

Probability of conceiving a child with Down syndrome according to maternal age by NDSS:

 At age 20, 1 in 2000
 At age 24, 1 in 1300
 At age 25, 1 in 1200
 At age 29, 1 in 950
 At age 30, 1 in 900
 At age 34, 1 in 450
 At age 35, 1 in 350
 At age 39, 1 in 150
 At age 40, 1 in 100
 At age 44, 1 in 40
 At age 45, 1 in 30
 At age 49, 1 in 10

In addition to Down syndrome, pregnant women over 35 are also at increased risk for other birth defects. A study conducted by Gill et al. found an association of advanced maternal age >40 and birth defects such as cardiac issues, esophageal atresia, hypospadias, and craniosynostosis. Lastly, studies have reported that pregnant women over 35 also have increased risk for premature birth and babies with low birth weight.

Ovarian aging
Substantial evidence indicates that the capability to repair DNA double strand breaks by a repair pathway involving BRCA1 (Breast cancer type 1 susceptibility) protein and ATM (ataxia–telangiectasia mutated) serine/threonine kinase weakens with age in oocytes of numerous species including humans.  The specific DNA repair pathway affected by age is the homologous recombination DNA repair pathway.  In general, women with BRCA1 mutations have lower ovarian reserves and experience earlier menopause.

See also 
Paternal age effect
Advanced maternal age
Pregnancy over age 50

References

External links 

http://www.reproductivefacts.org/uploadedFiles/ASRM_Content/Resources/Patient_Resources/Fact_Sheets_and_Info_Booklets/agefertility.pdf, by American Society for Reproductive Medicine

Fertility